95 The Ultimate One (95.1 FM) is a radio station broadcasting from Trinidad and Tobago owned and operated by Guardian Media Limited.  It is currently the oldest station in Trinidad and Tobago. The station rebranded from "951 The Best Mix" to "951 Remix" on November 27, 2017 and then to "95 The Ultimate One" on March 28, 2022.

See also
 Hott 93
 Star 947
 Guardian Media Limited
 Rick Dees Weekly Top 40
 The TBC Radio Network
 CNC3
 Trinidad and Tobago Guardian

References

External links
 

Radio stations in Trinidad and Tobago
Radio stations established in 1976